KEPCO Nuclear Fuel(KEPCO NF) is a South Korean public enterprise established in 1982. It provides nuclear fuels to 24 nuclear power plants in South Korea. The price of the nuclear fuel provided by the company accounts for 60% of the average international price.

See also

 KEPCO E&C
 KEPCO

References

External links 
 

Nuclear fuel companies
Companies of South Korea
Companies based in Daejeon
Companies established in 1982
Nuclear technology in South Korea